Ryazanovsky is an urban locality (a work settlement) under the administrative jurisdiction of the Town of Yegoryevsk in Moscow Oblast, Russia. Population:

History 
Ryazanovsky was founded in 1932. It was granted the status of an urban-type settlement in 1949.

On 8 December 2015, it was merged into the town of Yegoryevsk. On 25 September 2017, however, it was restored as a separate work settlement under the administrative jurisdiction of Yegoryevsk.

References

Urban-type settlements in Moscow Oblast